Nakedtop is a summit in Page County, Virginia, in the United States.

Nakedtop was so called because its peak has no trees.

Nakedtop is visible from the Appalachian Trail.

References

Mountains of Page County, Virginia
Mountains of Virginia